Guillaume Peltier (born 27 August 1976) is a French politician, former teacher and business leader who has represented the 2nd constituency of the Loir-et-Cher department in the National Assembly since 2017. He has also served in the Departmental Council of Loir-et-Cher for the canton of Chambord since 2021. Peltier is a member of Reconquête.

Career
Peltier is a former member of the National Front (FN) and former leader of its youth section. He led The Strong Right, a right-wing populist faction of the Union for a Popular Movement (UMP), later The Republicans (LR), similar to The Popular Right faction. Peltier was a founder of the anti-abortion student group Young Christian Action (Jeunesse Action Chrétienté).

In 2014, he's elected as mayor of Neung-sur-Beuvron and chairman of the Communauté de Communes de la Sologne des Etangs.

In 2017, he's elected as member of the Parlement.

On 9 January 2022, Peltier joined Reconquête (R!) to become party leader Éric Zemmour's deputy, in support of Zemmour's campaign in the 2022 presidential election. Zemmour has stated Peltier joining the party would allow it to heavily increase its access into local political structures. Earlier, Peltier was spokesman (2016–2017) and vice president (2019–2021) of The Republicans (LR). In the 2022 French legislative election he lost his seat after being eliminated in the first round.

References

External link

1976 births
Living people
French anti-abortion activists
Politicians from Paris
National Rally (France) politicians
National Republican Movement politicians
Movement for France politicians
The Republicans (France) politicians
The Strong Right
Reconquête politicians
Deputies of the 15th National Assembly of the French Fifth Republic
Lycée Buffon alumni
Lycée Lakanal alumni
Pantheon-Sorbonne University alumni
Regional councillors of France
Departmental councillors (France)